Cyriaque Louvion (born 24 July 1987) is a French professional footballer who plays as a centre-back for Championnat National 2 club Thonon Evian.

Club career
On 8 August 2019, Louvion left Tours to join Thonon Evian.

Honours 
Thonon Evian

 Championnat National 3: 2021–22
 Régional 1 Auvergne-Rhône-Alpes: 2019–20

Notes

References

External links

1987 births
Living people
French footballers
French expatriate footballers
France youth international footballers
Olympique Lyonnais players
OGC Nice players
AS Cannes players
Le Mans FC players
Le Havre AC players
Ergotelis F.C. players
Tours FC players
Thonon Evian Grand Genève F.C. players
Ligue 1 players
Ligue 2 players
Championnat National players
Championnat National 2 players
Championnat National 3 players
Régional 1 players
Association football defenders
French expatriate sportspeople in Greece
Expatriate footballers in Greece
Footballers from Toulouse